Sathanur is a village in Alathur Taluk, Perambalur District, Tamilnadu India.

It is home to the National Fossil Wood Park, Sathanur.. Fossil tree was formed 12million years ago. It has been declared national geological monument by the Geological survey of India.
 1000 years old  lake is there it was constructed by The great Chozha  emperor  & Hundreds of years old Lord Siva & Perumal temple there. 15 small lakes now presented here.
Panchayat union president: Mr.kulanthaivelu

Population
The population in Sathanur village was 1,749, consisting of 875 males and 874 females, according to the census of 2011 by Indian Government. There were 173 children under the age of six, 93 male and 80 female.
There were 495 households in Sathanur at that time.

The number of members of Scheduled Castes was 661. There were no members of Scheduled Tribes.

Literacy rate
648 males and 493 females were literate, leaving 608 illiterates.

Workers
506 males and 518 females were workers, for a total of 1024. Of these, 937 were regular and 87 were irregular i.e., only worked a few days per month. There are 725 non-workers.

Villages in Perambalur district